Seoul Metropolitan City Route 90 is an urban road located in Seoul, South Korea.

Stopovers

 Seoul
 Yangcheon District - Yeongdeungpo District - Dongjak District - Seocho District - Gangnam District - Songpa District - Gangdong District

List of Facilities 
IS: Intersection, IC: Interchange

References

Roads in Seoul